The Lake Hotel, also known as Lake Yellowstone Hotel is one of a series of hotels built to accommodate visitors to Yellowstone National Park in the late 19th and early 20th century.  Built in 1891, it is the oldest operating hotel in the park.  It was re-designed and substantially expanded by Robert Reamer, architect of the Old Faithful Inn in 1903.  In contrast to the Old Faithful Inn and many other western park facilities, the Lake Hotel is a relatively plain clapboarded Colonial Revival structure with three large Ionic porticoes facing Yellowstone Lake.  It was designated a National Historic Landmark in 2015.

The original 1891 hotel was a large three-story structure with projecting bays at each end.  Its construction was supervised by R.R. Cummins for the Northern Pacific Railway, which was building two other, similar hotels in the park. Reamer's 1903 remodeling changed these projections to the present Ionic porticoes. An eastward extension was added at this time, with a third matching portico. In 1922-23 a further extension to the east was undertaken, this with a flat roof. In 1928 a two-story west wing was added, expanding the dining room and adding a solarium to the front. The entire hotel was extensively renovated from 1984 to 1990.

The Lake Hotel is adjoined by the Lake Fish Hatchery Historic District and the Grand Loop Road Historic District.

The west wing of the Lake Hotel was renovated in the winter and spring of 2012, including the formal dining room and beautiful sun room/lounge. The remaining rooms in the east end of the hotel will be renovated during the fall and winter of 2013-2014.

Lake Yellowstone Hotel & Cabins is a member of Historic Hotels of America, the official program of the National Trust for Historic Preservation.

See also
List of Historic Hotels of America
List of National Historic Landmarks in Wyoming

References

External links

Lake Hotel at the Wyoming State Historic Preservation Office
Lake Hotel, Hotel Building, .5 mile east of Grand Loop Road & 1.3 miles southwest of Lake Junction, Lake, Teton, WY at the Historic American Buildings Survey

Hotel buildings on the National Register of Historic Places in Wyoming
Hotels in Wyoming
Hotel buildings completed in 1903
Railway hotels in the United States
Historic American Buildings Survey in Wyoming
National Historic Landmarks in Wyoming
National Register of Historic Places in Teton County, Wyoming
Hotel buildings completed in 1891
Hotels established in 1891
1891 establishments in Wyoming
Colonial Revival architecture in Wyoming
National Register of Historic Places in Yellowstone National Park
Robert Reamer buildings
Northern Pacific Railway
Buildings and structures in Yellowstone National Park in Wyoming
Historic Hotels of America